Francis V. Guinan Jr. (born November 17, 1951) is an American film, television and stage actor who is perhaps best known for his role as Edgar Teller the patriarch in the short-lived series Eerie, Indiana.

The Council Bluffs, Iowa-born actor has made guest appearances in many notable television series including Grey's Anatomy, CSI: Miami, Law & Order, CSI: NY, Without a Trace, The Practice, Crossing Jordan, Star Trek: Enterprise, Star Trek: Voyager, That '70s Show, Nash Bridges, Sliders, Murder, She Wrote, Frasier, Mike & Molly and other series.

He has been a member of the Steppenwolf Theatre Company ensemble since 1979. In December 2007, Guinan co-starred in the Tracy Letts' play August: Osage County which opened on Broadway to critical acclaim.
He played Master Pakku in the 2010 film, The Last Airbender as well as appeared in the films Hannibal (2001), Constantine (2005) and Abundant Acreage Available (2017).

Selected filmography
 1988 The Serpent and the Rainbow as American Doctor
 1988 Miles from Home as Tommy Malin
 1992 Rock Hudson as Carl
 1992 Shining Through as Andrew Berringer
 1997 Speed 2: Cruise Control as Rupert
 1999 Guinevere as Alan Sloane
 2001 Hannibal as FBI Assistant Director Noonan
 2005 Constantine as Father Garret
 2010 The Last Airbender as Master Pakku
 2010 All Good Things as Daniel Patrick Moynihan
 2013 Killing Kennedy as Lyndon B. Johnson
 2015 Henry Gamble's Birthday Party as Larry Montgomery
 2017 The Evil Within as Dr. Preston
 2017 Abundant Acreage Available as Tom
 2019 Saint Frances as Dennis
 2022 Relative as David Frank

Awards and nominations

Theatre

Film

References

External links
 
 

20th-century American male actors
21st-century American male actors
Male actors from Iowa
American male film actors
American male television actors
American male stage actors
Living people
People from Council Bluffs, Iowa
Steppenwolf Theatre Company players
1951 births